Valentine Gill "Vallie" Hall III  (November 12, 1867, New York – October 26, 1934) was an American tennis player who was active in the late 19th century. He was the elder son of Valentine Gill Hall Jr. and Mary Livingston Ludlow of the Livingston family. Vallie's eldest sister was Anna Rebecca Hall, making him an uncle of First Lady of the United States, Anna Eleanor Roosevelt.

Career
In 1888 and 1890 he won the Men's Doubles title at the U.S. National Championships, also reaching the semi-finals in the Men's Singles in 1891 (and the quarter-finals in 1890, 1892 and 1893).

In 1891 he won the Southampton Invitation tennis tournament staged at the Meadow Club,  Southampton, NY.  Together with his brother Edward Ludlow Hall (1872–1932) he won the National Eastern Doubles Championships in 1892.

In 1889 he wrote a book titled Lawn Tennis in America containing biographical sketches of prominent players. He was a secretary of the United States National Lawn Tennis Association.

Grand Slam finals

Doubles (2 titles, 3 runner-ups)

References

External links
 Hall, Valentine, Lawn Tennis in America, 1889

1867 births
1934 deaths
American male tennis players
United States National champions (tennis)
Grand Slam (tennis) champions in men's doubles
Livingston family
Tennis people from New York (state)